The  is a large pumped-storage hydroelectric power station in Kijo in the Koyu District of Miyazaki Prefecture, Japan.

The facility is run by the Kyushu Electric Power Company.
The power plant started operation in July 2007 and all four units were commissioned by July 2011.
Like most pumped-storage facilities, the power station uses two reservoirs, releasing and pumping as the demand rises and falls. 
Oseuchi Dam and Kanasumi Dam form the upper artificial reservoir, while Ishikawauchi Dam on the Omaru river (Omarugawa) forms the lower reservoir. Ishikawauchi Dam is a 47.5 m concrete gravity dam, while Oseuchi and Kanasumi dams are rock-fill dams, 65.5 m and 42.5 m high, respectively. The natural influx on water on the upper reservoir is limited, therefore the plant can be considered almost pure pumped-storage. The entire upper pond was made waterproof with asphalt to avoid leakage in the surrounding permeable soil.

The two reservoirs are connected through underground penstocks. The power plant is located underground in the middle. The power station employs 4 pump-generators. Unit 1 and 4 were manufactured by Hitachi, while units 2 and 3 are from Mitsubishi. The maximum amount of water used by the plant is 222 cubic meters per second, for an effective storage capacity of 7 hours. All units are adjustable speed systems, allowing for a rapid variation of power levels during both pumping and generation.

A visitor's center, Pino' Q Park, was opened by Kyushu Electric Power in July 2008. The center features miniature models of the power plant, videos and other media to explain the operation of the pumped-storage plant.

See also 

 List of power stations in Japan
 Hydroelectricity in Japan
 List of pumped-storage hydroelectric power stations

Notes

Dams in Miyazaki Prefecture
Pumped-storage hydroelectric power stations in Japan
Energy infrastructure completed in 2011
2011 establishments in Japan